The 1990–91 BBL season was the 4th season of the British Basketball League (known as the Carlsberg League for sponsorship reasons) since its establishment in 1987. The season featured a total of nine teams, playing 24 games each.
Following a new £1.3 million sponsorship deal with Carlsberg, the sport was unified once more as three divisions of the Carlsberg League were created.
Solent Stars dropped out of the top tier and would play their basketball in Division Four. Hemel Hempstead Royals and Worthing Bears returned to top tier action and the Bracknell Tigers became the Thames Valley Tigers.

Kingston claimed the Division One title and Play-off crown, as well as the League Trophy, earning their coach Kevin Cadle and star player Alton Byrd the award's for Coach and Player of the Year respectively. Sunderland claimed the National Cup preventing another Kingston clean sweep.

Carlsberg League Division One (Tier 1)

Final standings

The play-offs

Quarter-finals 
(1) Kingston vs. (8) Hemel Royals

(2) Sunderland Saints vs. (7) Worthing Bears

(3) Thames Valley Tigers vs. (6) Manchester Giants

(4) Leicester City Riders vs. (5) Derby Rams

Semi-finals

Final

National League Division 2 (Tier 2)

Final standings

National League Division 3 (Tier 3)

Final standings

Coca-Cola National Cup

Second round

Quarter-finals

Semi-finals

Final

NatWest Trophy

Group stage 
North Group

South Group

Semi-finals 
Manchester Giants vs. Leicester City Riders

Kingston vs. Thames Valley Tigers

Final

Seasonal awards 
 Most Valuable Player: Alton Byrd (Kingston)
 Coach of the Year: Kevin Cadle (Kingston)
 All-Star Team:
 Steve Bucknall (Sunderland Saints)
 Alton Byrd (Kingston)
 Martin Clark (Kingston)
 Alan Cunningham (Kingston)
 Kris Kearney (Manchester Giants)
 Ernest Lee (Derby Rams)
 Dan Meagher (Leicester City Riders)
 Dale Roberts (Thames Valley Tigers)
 Russ Saunders (Sunderland Saints)
 Clyde Vaughan (Sunderland Saints)

References 

British Basketball League seasons
1
British